A numismatic essay is a coin prototype proposed for general sale or circulation.

Coins